Acacia minutissima is a shrub belonging to the genus Acacia and the subgenus Phyllodineae that is endemic to parts of western Australia.

Description
The stem usually divides just above the ground to form horizontally spreading branches. It has light grey coloured slightly roughened bark and glabrous finely ribbed branchlets that are a light to reddish brown colour at the extremities but age to a grey colour. Like most species of Acacia it has phyllodes rather than true leaves.

Taxonomy
The species was first formally described by the botanist Bruce Maslin in 2008 as part of the work New taxa of Acacia (Leguminosae: Mimosoideae) and notes on other species from the Pilbara and adjacent desert regions of Western Australia as published in the journal Nuytsia. The specific epithet is derived from the Latin words meaning very small in reference to the size of the phyllodes.

Distribution
It is native to an area in the Pilbara and Goldfields-Esperance regions of Western Australia. The shrub has a range from the eastern edge of the Pilbara, to the east of Balfour Downs Station in the west to the Little Sandy Desert around Kumpupintil Lake in the east but has a scattered distribution composed of a series of discontinuous populations. In the areas where it does occur it is not uncommon. It is often situated in swales between sand dunes an on plains growing in sandy or loamy soils that at times have a gravelly mantle. It is usually a part of shrub steppe communities usually in association with a spinifex hummock grassland understorey.

See also
List of Acacia species

References

minutissima
Acacias of Western Australia
Taxa named by Bruce Maslin
Plants described in 2008